Alzi is a commune in the Haute-Corse department of France on the island of Corsica.

Population

Personalities
François Marcantoni (1920-2010), member of the French resistance and then involved in the Corsican mafia

See also
Communes of the Haute-Corse department

References

Communes of Haute-Corse